Talentime is a 2009 Malaysian Malay-language drama film written and directed by Yasmin Ahmad. Yasmin, in her blog, has described it "as a story full of joy and pain, hope and despair, a host of beautifully-written songs, and rich characters". A Hindu open cremation and a scene reminiscent of the 2001 Kampung Medan riots are included in the film.

The film was released on 26 March 2009 in Malaysia and marks Yasmin's last feature film prior to her death on 25 July 2009.

Plot
"The music teacher, who is herself a great performer is organising an inter-school talentime. Through the days of auditions, rehearsals and preparations, running up to the big day of the contest, the characters get embroiled in a world of heightened emotions - ambition, jealousy, human comedy, romance, heartbreak - all of which culminate in a day of great music and performances." Yasmin also mentioned that the idea behind Talentime was that as humans, we have to go through a lot of pain and some measure of suffering before we can reach greater heights.

A talent search competition has matched two hearts - that of Melur, a Malay-mixed girl and an Indian male student, Mahesh. Melur, with her melodious voice, singing whilst playing the piano is one of the seven finalists of the Talentime competition of her school organised by Cikgu Adibah. Likewise Hafiz, enthralling with his vocalist talent while playing the guitar, dividing his time between school and mother, who is hospitalised for brain tumor.

It all started after Mahesh, amongst the students assigned to get the finalists to school for practice, delivered the notice of successful audition to Melur's house. His handsome looks attracted the girl. Early on in their relationship, tragedy struck Mahesh's family when his uncle Ganesh who had been the care-taker of the family since the loss of Mahesh's father, was stabbed to death on his wedding day. Melur thinking that Mahesh's silence was due to his grief over the tragedy became furious when she was continuously ignored. She regretted it however after Hafiz revealed Mahesh's situation.

That changed Melur's perception of Mahesh. Likewise Mahesh, who grew comfortable with the presence of the girl who often quotes beautiful poetry. Mahesh, realising that the relationship will be opposed, kept it hidden from his mother, still grieving over the death of Ganesh. At last, the secret was exposed and Mahesh was assaulted before Melur's very eyes. Just a day before the competition, is Melur resilient enough to sing the poetic lyrics of her song when her heart is tormented by the thoughts of Mahesh? What about Mahesh who has found his first love? On Talentime night, everything unfolds.

Cast
 Mahesh Jugal Kishor as Mahesh, a hearing impaired Indian boy who becomes Melur's love interest.
 Pamela Chong as Melur, a Eurasian girl in the Talentime finals who sings and plays the piano.
 Syafie Naswip as Hafiz, a Malay boy in the Talentime finals who sings and plays the guitar.
 Jaclyn Victor as Bhavani, Mahesh's elder sister who has a penchant for picking on him.
 Howard Hon Kahoe as Kahoe, a Chinese boy in the Talentime finals who plays the erhu and resents Hafiz.
 Amelia Henderson as Melati, Melur's younger sister.
 Adibah Noor as Cikgu Adibah, the teacher in charge of organising the Talentime.
 Azean Irdawaty as Embun, Hafiz's mother who is diagnosed with terminal brain cancer.
 Harith Iskander as Harith, Melur's comical father.
 Sukania Venugopal as Mahesh's mother.
 Jit Murad as Ismael, A patient who befriends Embun at the hospital during her final days.
 Mislina Mustaffa as Melur's mother.
 Tan Mei Ling as Mei Ling, a Chinese Muslim convert who works as a maid for Melur's family.
 Ida Nerina as Datin Kalsom, a friend of Melur's mother who distrusts Mei Ling.

Sharifah Amani was supposed to be cast as Melur in the film. However, due to clash of schedules, she was replaced by Pamela Chong. She did, however, play a role as the 3rd Assistant Director for the film. This would mark the first time that Sharifah Amani has played a behind-the-scene role in Yasmin Ahmad's films.

Music
The film score was composed by Pete Teo. Songs include:
 O Re Piya by Rahat Fateh Ali Khan, taken from the Bollywood movie, Aaja Nachle
 I Go by Aizat Amdan.
 Just One Boy by Aizat Amdan.
 Angel by Atilia.
 Kasih Tak Kembali by Atilia.

All songs were written and produced by Teo himself, except Kasih Tak Kembali which was written by Ahmad Hashim.

The original soundtrack album was released by Universal Music, which also includes Malay language versions of many of the principal songs in the film. This includes I Go (as 'Pergi'), Angel, and Just One Boy (as 'Itulah Dirimu').

Screening
As in all of Yasmin's previous works, Talentime opens with the basmalah (Bismillahirahmanirrahim, "In the name of God, the most Gracious and most Merciful"). Like Muallaf, the verse is displayed in a language and script different from Arabic in Talentime, i.e. in Tamil - பிஸ்மில்லாஹிர்ரஹ்மானிர்ரஹீம்.

Awards and nominations

References

External links
 
 

2009 films
2009 drama films
Films directed by Yasmin Ahmad
Malaysian drama films
Tamil-language Malaysian films
Sign-language films
Malay-language films
Chinese-language Malaysian films
Films with screenplays by Yasmin Ahmad
Grand Brilliance films
Cantonese-language Malaysian films
2000s English-language films